Vokli Laroshi (born 6 August 2001) is an Albanian professional footballer who plays as a goalkeeper for the Albanian club Partizani and the Albania under-21 national team.

References

2001 births
Living people
People from Elbasan County
People from Elbasan
Albanian footballers
Association football goalkeepers
KF Gostima players
KF Turbina players
Shkëndija Durrës players
FK Partizani Tirana players
Kategoria e Parë players
Kategoria Superiore players